Parornix torquillella is a moth of the family Gracillariidae. It is known from all of Europe, except Spain and parts of the Balkan Peninsula.

The wingspan is 9–13 mm. The head is pale ochreous mixed with fuscous. Palpi white. Forewings are rather dark fuscous, purplish-tinged, towards dorsum and costa more blackish numerous costal streaks, a spot in disc posteriorly, and two or three dorsal spots white; a black apical dot, strongly white edged anteriorly; cilia with three entire dark fuscous lines. Hind wings are grey. The larva is pale yellow -green; dorsal line dark green or reddish; head pale yellow; segment 2 with four black spots.

The larvae feed on Prunus cerasus, Prunus domestica, Prunus insititia, Prunus maritima and Prunus spinosa. They mine the leaves of their host plant. The mine starts as a lower-surface epidermal gallery that widens into a blotch. In the end, it becomes a small, only weakly inflated tentiform mine. The lower epidermis is whitish, unfolded, and rather transparent. The leaf tissue is eaten up to the upper epidermis. The frass is deposited in a corner of the mine. In the end, the larva leaves the mine and lives freely under a leaf tip or margin that has been folded downwards, or in a leaf that is rolled into a pod.

References

Parornix
Moths of Europe
Moths described in 1850